Wil Besseling (born 9 December 1985) is a Dutch professional golfer.

Besseling was born in Utrecht. He won the Dutch Amateur Match Play Championship in 2001, just two years after taking up the sport. The highlight of his amateur career came in 2006, when he won the Eisenhower Trophy in partnership with Joost Luiten and Tim Sluiter, and also finished with the lowest individual score.

After turning professional at the end of 2006, Besseling played on the EPD Tour, one of the developmental golf tours based in Europe, during 2007. He finished 5th on the 2007 Order of Merit, having been in the top 20 in all but two events, with seven top tens and one victory.

At the end of the year, Besseling attempted to gain his card on the European Tour via the qualifying school. He was unsuccessful, and had to settle playing on the second tier Challenge Tour in 2008. He won his first title on that tour at the second tournament of the season, the Club Colombia Masters, when he was a runaway winner, finishing seven strokes clear of the field. He also collected three runners-up prizes during the year, and ended the season in 15th place on the money list to graduate directly to the European Tour for 2009.

Amateur wins
2001 Dutch Amateur Match Play Championship

Professional wins (4)

Challenge Tour wins (1)

1Co-sanctioned by the Tour de las Américas

Challenge Tour playoff record (0–2)

EPD Tour wins (1)

Hi5 Pro Tour wins (1)
2008 Hi5 Pro Tour Al Torreal

Other wins (1)

Results in major championships

"T" = tied

Team appearances
Amateur
European Boys' Team Championship (representing the Netherlands): 2002, 2003
European Amateur Team Championship (representing the Netherlands): 2003, 2005
European Youths' Team Championship (representing the Netherlands): 2004, 2006
Eisenhower Trophy (representing the Netherlands): 2004, 2006 (team winners and individual leader)
St Andrews Trophy (representing the Continent of Europe): 2006

See also
2008 Challenge Tour graduates
2011 European Tour Qualifying School graduates

References

External links

Wil Besseling – profile on the Golfteam Holland site (in Dutch)

Dutch male golfers
European Tour golfers
People from Hoorn
Sportspeople from North Holland
1985 births
Living people
21st-century Dutch people